Raymond Kamber (26 December 1929 – 8 January 2010) was a Swiss sprint canoer who competed in the early 1950s. He finished 16th in the K-1 10000 m event at the 1952 Summer Olympics in Helsinki.

Kamber was also a sports journalist and chaired the canoe/kayak commission of the International Sport Press Association (AIPS). In 2008, he became an honorary member of the International Canoe Federation.

References

External links
 
 

1929 births
2010 deaths
Swiss male canoeists
Olympic canoeists of Switzerland
Canoeists at the 1952 Summer Olympics